The Southeastern Statistical Region is one of eight statistical regions of North Macedonia. Southeastern, located in the southeastern part of the country, borders Greece and Bulgaria. Internally, it borders the Vardar and Eastern statistical regions.

Municipalities

The Southeastern statistical region is divided into 10 municipalities:
Bogdanci
Bosilovo
Dojran
Gevgelija
Konče
Novo Selo
Radoviš
Strumica
Valandovo
Vasilevo

Demographics

Population
The current population of the Southeastern Statistical Region is 171,416 citizens, according to the last population census in 2002.

Ethnicities
The largest ethnic group in the region are the Macedonians.

References

Statistical regions of North Macedonia